A training ground is an area where professional association football teams prepare for matches, with activities primarily concentrating on skills and fitness. They also sometimes form part of a club's youth system, as clubs consider it important to have good facilities to aid the development of young players.

Training grounds are usually separate from a team's stadium, as clubs use the facilities to avoid overusing the stadium's pitch. However, teams usually train inside the opposing team's stadium on the day before a European away game, both for the benefit of the media and to become familiar with the surface.

Training ground incidents 
There have been several high-profile incidents, at training grounds, where players have been injured in disputes between teammates. Joey Barton was given a suspended prison sentence, on 1 July 2008, for an assault on teammate Ousmane Dabo on Manchester City's training ground and Andy Carroll broke teammate Steven Taylor's jaw in a fight.

Gallery

References

See also 

 Professional football training exercises and sessions
 Football (soccer) tactics and skills

 
Association football terminology